Vivo Software was a pioneer internet streaming media company which was acquired by RealNetworks in March 1998. Vivo Software designed the Vivo Video/Audio platform, including its encoding tools and end-user VivoActive Player.

The Vivo format, obsolete today, was one of the first to be designed and used for internet streaming. The Vivo platform was a well-known player when streaming media was in its infancy and was deployed mainly on erotic sites during the mid-1990s. Since then RealPlayer, QuickTime and Windows Media have evolved as the dominant platforms. The development of Vivo ceased in 1997 to be replaced by RealPlayer from RealNetworks.

VivoActive

VivoActive is an audio/video format created by Vivo Software, acquired by RealNetworks in 1997. The Vivo format is based upon H.263 video and G.723 ADPCM audio (not the G.723.1 speech codec). It uses inter-frame coding, but does not insert any key frames, except at the beginning of the clip, which effectively disables the possibility of seeking to specific locations in the stream. One of the last released versions of VivoActive Player added a workaround for this handicap by quickly decoding all frames from the first one to the requested position.

MPlayer is able to play and convert Vivo video clips.

Playback
The official client (The VivoActive Player) was limited. Current available clients are:

Mplayer - http://www.mplayerhq.hu
RealPlayer - http://www.real.com
VivoActive Browser Plug-in - http://egg.real.com/vivo-player/vivodl.html

See also
RealMedia
RealNetworks

References

External links
 Internet Assigned Numbers Authority for vivo
 VivoActive Browser Plug-In Download
 RealNetworks Acquisition History
 Multimedia Vivo

Defunct software companies of the United States
Software companies disestablished in 1998
Video codecs
Audio codecs
RealNetworks
1998 mergers and acquisitions